Bhulan the Maze is an Indian Chhattisgarhi language drama film written and directed  by Manoj Verma and produced by Swapnil Film Productions. The film is based on Sanjeev Bakshi's noval Bhulan Kanda. The film stars Omkar Das Manikpuri, Rajendra Gupta, Mukesh Tiwari, Ashok Mishra and Anima Pagare. It focuses on social justice in the Bhujiya community, a tribal community indigenous to Chhattisgarh state.

Plot 
The story presents Bhakla and Birju, who are residents of Mahuabhata. They fight over land. Accidentally Birju dies after falling on a plough. Bhakla has a family so the villagers are not inclined to send him to jail. Instead they request that Ganjha, a lonely old man from the same village, confess to the murder. Ganjha gets life imprisonment. In the jail the jailor observes Ganjha’s noble behaviour that lead him to believe that he can’t be a murderer. The jailor appealed to the high court and the truth is revealed. Ganjha is released, and the villagers are sent to jail for hiding the truth. On their way to jail they realise that the people from the big cities are under the influence of the plant “bhulan”, and they are amazed that these people are not awake. Bhakla had a habit of saying “hao” (yes) before every sentence. When he is presented before the court the prosecutor proves Bhakla guilty of misusing his habit of saying “hao”. Bhakla gets the death penalty. He is later acquitted.

Cast 

 Omkar Das Manikpuri as Bhakla
 Rajendra Gupta as  Adavocate Tripathi
 Mukesh Tiwari as  Public Prosecutor Pandey
 Ashok Mishra as Masterji
 Aanima Pagare as Bhakla wife
 Sanjay Mahanand as Kotwar
Ashish Shendre as Mukhiya(Head of Village)
Pushpendra Singh as Thanedaar(Head of Police Station)
Mukesh Marko (Kalyan)

Soundtrack

Accolades 

 National Film Awards for Best Feature Film in Chhattisgarhi(2019).

Notes

References

External links 
 
 

Chhattisgarhi-language films
2022 drama films
2022 films
Indian drama films